Briscoe may refer to:

Places

United Kingdom
 Briscoe, Cumbria, England

United States
 Briscoe, Missouri
 Briscoe, Texas
 Briscoe, West Virginia
 Briscoe County, Texas

Other
 Briscoe (automotive company), defunct American automobile manufacturer
 Briscoe (surname)
 USS Briscoe (DD-977), U.S. Navy destroyer
 The Briscoe Brothers, professional wrestling team
 Briscoe Group, New Zealand retail chain

See also
 Brisco (disambiguation)
 Bristow (disambiguation)
 Bristowe